Waldemar Fibigr (20 June 1966 – 21 October 2022) was a Czechoslovak sprint canoer who competed from the late 1980s to the late 1990s. He won three medals at the ICF Canoe Sprint World Championships with a silver (C-4 200 m: 1995) and two bronzes (C-4 200 m: 1994; C-4 500 m: 1993).

Fibgir also competed in two Summer Olympics, earning his best finish of ninth in the C-2 500 m event at Barcelona in 1992.

Fibigr died on 21 October 2022, at the age of 56.

References

Sports-reference.com profile

1966 births
2022 deaths
Canoeists at the 1988 Summer Olympics
Canoeists at the 1992 Summer Olympics
Czech male canoeists
Czechoslovak male canoeists
Olympic canoeists of Czechoslovakia
ICF Canoe Sprint World Championships medalists in Canadian
Sportspeople from Pardubice